Barabani Assembly constituency is an assembly constituency in Paschim Bardhaman district in the Indian state of West Bengal.

Overview
As per orders of the Delimitation Commission, No. 283 Barabani assembly constituency covers Barabani and Salanpur community development blocks.

Barabani assembly segment is part of No. 40 Asansol (Lok Sabha constituency).

Members of Legislative Assembly

Election results

2021

 

*The change percentage is based on votes polled by CPI(M) in the previous election. In this election INC is in alliance with CPI(M) and in the previous election it did not contest from this seat.

2016

2011
In the 2011 election, Bidhan Upadhyay of Trinamool Congress defeated his nearest rival Abhas Raychaudhuri of CPI(M).

.# Swing calculated on Congress+Trinamool Congress vote percentages in 2006 taken together.

1977-2006
In the 2006 state assembly elections, Dilip Sarkar of CPI (M) won the Barabani assembly seat defeating Manik Upadhyay of Trinamool Congress. Contests in most years were multi cornered but only winners and runners are being mentioned. Manik Upadhyay representing Trinamool Congress in 2001 and Congress in 1996, won the seat twice defeating Rudranath Mukherjee and Paresh Maji, both of CPI (M), respectively. In 1991, S.R.Das of CPI (M) defeated Manik Upadhyay of Congress. In 1989, Manik Upadhyay of Congress won the Barabani seat in a bye election. In 1987 and 1982, Ajit Chakraborty of CPI (M) defeated Manik Upadhyay and Dhiraj Sain, both of Congress, respectively. In 1977, Sunil Basu Roy of CPI (M) defeated Sukumar Bandopadhyay of Congress.

1962-1972
Prior to that those who won the Barabani seat were Sukumar Banerjee of Congress in 1972, Sunil Basu Roy of CPI (M) in 1971 and 1969,  Mihir Upadhyay of Congress in 1967, and Haridas Chakraborty of CPI in 1962.

References

Politics of Paschim Bardhaman district
Assembly constituencies of West Bengal